Bo Aung Kyaw Street or Road, formerly Sparks Street is a major street, passing south–north through Kyauktada Township and Botataung Township in southern Yangon, Burma.

The street contains a number of historical buildings including Saint Mary's Cathedral, Yangon (located at the very north of the street on the corner with  Bogyoke Aung San Road) and Sri Sri Durba Bari Hindu Temple. It is also a major business street; several Burmese airlines and travel companies have their headquarters along this street, as does The Myanmar Times and the Burmese Central Post Office, located at 39-41 Bo Aung  Kyaw Street. It also has several hotels, such as Aye Yar Hotel located at 170/176 Bo Aung Kyaw Street.

References

Streets in Yangon